A constitutional referendum was held in Venezuela on 15 December 1999. Voters were asked whether they approved of the new constitution drawn up by the Constitutional Assembly elected earlier in the year. The question was:

It was approved by 72% of voters, although turnout was only 44%.

Controversy
Some in Venezuela believed that the new constitution centralized the national government greatly, granting it too much power while also making too many promises. Henrique Capriles Radonski, then Vice President of the Congress and President of the Chamber of Deputies, stated "This is a centralist, presidentialist constitution with no spread of power to the states and cities ... This is a corrupt constitution that will leave Venezuela backward and poor". Others scoffed at all of the red tape the constitution granted which would scare away foreign investment while also recognizing over-reliance on imported goods.

Weeks before the election, tens of thousands protested against the constitutional changes on 24 November 1999, stating that it granted the president, Hugo Chávez, too much power. Chávez responded to his opposition, stating "Those who side with the 'No' vote should get ready because the attack will be merciless ... I will put my boots on and unsheathe my sword".

Results

References

Referendum 2
Venezuela
1999 12
Constitutions of Venezuela
1999 12